The Camaquã River is a river of Rio Grande do Sul state in southern Brazil.

The delta of the river, where it empties into the Lagoa dos Patos, is protected by the  Camaquã State Park, created in 1975.

See also
List of rivers of Rio Grande do Sul

References

Brazilian Ministry of Transport

Rivers of Rio Grande do Sul